Lucila "Lucy" Becerra González (born 22 July 1965) is a former professional tennis player from Mexico.

Biography

Tennis career
Becerra reached a best singles ranking of 253 in the world and won nine professional titles on the ITF circuit. As a doubles player she was ranked as high as 194 and won 22 ITF titles.

A three-time Pan American Games medalist, Becerra won the mixed doubles gold at Indianapolis in 1987, to go with her women's doubles bronze medal in the same tournament. She won a further women's doubles bronze medal at the 1995 Pan American Games in Mar del Plata.

Her Fed Cup career for Mexico spanned 10 years and she appeared in a total of 15 ties. She won 11 matches overall, five in singles and six in doubles.

Personal life
Becerra lives in Mazatlán and is married with two children, twins Lucy and Mariano.

ITF finals

Singles: 16 (9–7)

Doubles: 27 (22–5)

Notes

References

External links
 
 
 

1965 births
Living people
Mexican female tennis players
Sportspeople from Mazatlán
Tennis players at the 1987 Pan American Games
Tennis players at the 1995 Pan American Games
Pan American Games gold medalists for Mexico
Pan American Games bronze medalists for Mexico
Pan American Games medalists in tennis
Central American and Caribbean Games medalists in tennis
Central American and Caribbean Games silver medalists for Mexico
Central American and Caribbean Games bronze medalists for Mexico
Medalists at the 1987 Pan American Games
Medalists at the 1995 Pan American Games
20th-century Mexican women